Bradley Fletcher (born June 25, 1986) is a former American football cornerback. He was drafted by the St. Louis Rams of the National Football League (NFL) in the third round of the 2009 NFL Draft. He played college football at Iowa.

Fletcher also played for the Philadelphia Eagles and New England Patriots.

Early years
At Liberty High School, in Youngstown, Ohio, Fletcher was First-team All-Conference, All-District, and All-State as a senior, where he had 74 tackles, 43 solo tackles, two interceptions and six pass break-ups on defense and on offense, as a running back, rushed 143 times for 815 yards 12 touchdowns as a senior. As a junior, he was named First-team All-Conference and honorable mention All-State.  He recorded 207 tackles, 81 solo tackles, 13 pass break-ups and four interceptions in prep career along with 17 receptions for 314 yards. Fletcher was also an All-State basketball player.

College career
As a senior at Iowa in 2008 Fletcher recorded 60 tackles, including 42 solo stops and 18 assists and  led team with 10 pass break-ups while intercepting three passes. Fletcher redshirted as a freshman in 2004 and saw action as a backup in 2005, recording one tackle in the ten games he played. He was again a backup in 2006 playing in 13 games with 4 starts, recording 38 tackles (24 solo) and a forced fumble. As a junior in 2007 he played the same role as 2006, a backup cornerback. In 2007, he played in 11 games, starting four, recording 52 tackles (30 solo) and intercepted two passes, forced a fumble and recovered one as well while breaking up three passes.

Professional career

Pre-draft measurables

St. Louis Rams
Fletcher was drafted by the Rams in the third round of the 2009 NFL Draft.

Philadelphia Eagles
Fletcher signed with the Philadelphia Eagles on March 12, 2013. In 2014, he allowed the most yards in the NFL (1,072) and the second most touchdowns allowed (9). After 2 years, the Eagles decided not to re-sign Fletcher and he left in free agency.

New England Patriots
Fletcher signed with the New England Patriots on March 18, 2015. He played in two games with New England and was released on October 10, 2015.

References

1986 births
Living people
Players of American football from Youngstown, Ohio
American football cornerbacks
Iowa Hawkeyes football players
St. Louis Rams players
Philadelphia Eagles players
New England Patriots players
Ed Block Courage Award recipients